Dağ Bağırlı is a village and municipality in the Shamakhi Rayon of Azerbaijan. It has a population of 1,258.

References

Populated places in Shamakhi District